St Patrick's Athletic Ladies Football Club is an Irish association football club based in Inchicore, Dublin. It is the women's section of St Patrick's Athletic F.C.

History
In 1996 St Patrick's Athletic F.C. took over the women's football team O'Connell Chics. In 1996 O'Connell Chics were runners up in both the Dublin Women's Soccer League and the FAI Women's Cup. In 1997 as St Patrick's Athletic L.F.C. and with a team that included Emma Byrne and Ciara Grant they were the DWSL champions. At least four St. Pat's players, Byrne, Grant, Grainne Kierans and Yvonne Tracy, went on to play for Arsenal.

Notable players

Republic of Ireland women's internationals

Honours

O'Connell Chics

Dublin Women's Soccer League
Runners-up: 1996: 1
FAI Women's Cup
Runners-up: 1996: 1

St Patrick's Athletic

Dublin Women's Soccer League
Winners: 1997: 1

References

Women
Women's association football clubs in the Republic of Ireland
1996 establishments in Ireland
Association football clubs established in 1996
Association football clubs in Dublin (city)
Dublin Women's Soccer League teams